was a bimonthly Japanese manga magazine published in Osaka from November 1906 to March 1950. Its publisher when it first launched was Kibunkan, located in the Funeba area in central Osaka, which later changed its name to the Osaka Puck Company. When it ceased publication, it was published by the Osaka Shimbun Company.

Overview
Osaka Puck was launched in 1906, with the Western-style artist Akamatsu Rinsaku playing a central role. Its format placed it in opposition to the satirical comics magazine Tokyo Puck, which launched in Tokyo in 1905 under editor-in-chief Kitazawa Rakuten. In its early years, it grew its circulation by perfecting sales through station vendors. It continued regular publication as a "wholesome manga magazine" even while other satirical comics magazines shut down one after the other due to excessive competition and the intensification of the Pacific War. It changed its name to Manga Japan in 1943 in accordance with a prohibition on the English language, but in January 1945 was forced to cease publication temporarily.

Osaka Puck resumed publication in September 1945 after the end of the war. Although it relaunched in 1946 under the title Reading Material and Manga, it ultimately ceased publication in March 1950 after more than 43 years in print. It held the record for longest-running comics periodical in Japan until April 1997, when it was surpassed by Kodansha's Nakayoshi.

References
 Isao Shimizu, Birth of Modern Japanese Manga, 

1906 establishments in Japan
1950 disestablishments in Japan
Bi-monthly manga magazines published in Japan
Defunct magazines published in Japan
Humor magazines
Magazines established in 1906
Magazines disestablished in 1950
Mass media in Osaka